Marriage age may refer to:
Age at first marriage, a list of countries by age at first marriage
Marriageable age, the legal minimum age for marriage